Michael Wallisch (born 1 November 1985) is a German professional boxer. He held the WBO European heavyweight title from 2015 to 2016.

Professional career
On 11 July 2015 Wallisch won the vacant WBO European Heavyweight Title with a knockout win over Italian Fabio Tuiach early in the 2nd round. He defended the title against Croatian Ivica Bacurin at the Maritim Hotel in Berlin, Germany, on 9 January 2016, winning the fight by unanimous decision after 12 rounds.

After three more wins (over Andre Bunga, Samir Barakovic, Bernard Adie) he faced Christian Hammer as undefeated, with a record of 19–0. By then Wallisch had been long considered a boxing prospect, though his career had been hindered by injuries and other troubles. It was his first chance against a valuable opponent, however, he was defeated by Hammer. In the fifth round, Hammer went out of a clinch and hit him with a right, and Wallisch, who seemed to "overplay the incident", sat down on the ropes, seemingly tired, as the referee counted him out.

Wallisch's loss to Hammer was followed by another defeat, this time at the hands of Efe Ajagba. After defeating Abdulnaser Delalic in Hamburg, he suffered his third loss, being defeated by Tony Yoka.

On 25 July 2020 Wallisch faced Joe Joyce at the BT Sport Studio in London, England. Wallisch put up a good fight in the first round, hitting Joyce with several solid punches. Joyce was in complete control in the second round, most notably causing Wallisch to drop to his knees after hitting him on his head. In the third round, Wallisch was forced again to touch the canvas with one knee, as he recovered after being hit by a left hook. He stood up once more and continued, but two power shots forced him to rest on one knee for a third time, and the referee was forced to stop the fight.

On 13 March 2021 he faced Didier "Knife" Kirola. Wallisch lost 18 kg before this fight. He dominated the fight from the first round and closed it by TKO in the 6th.

On 22 July 2021 Wallisch faced Murat Gassiev for the WBA Asia Heavyweight Title. Their fight was the main event of a multi-fight card, and took place at the Dynamo Volleyball Arena in Moscow, Russia. In the first round, which was dominated by Gassiev, there wasn't much action. Gassiev tracked Wallisch around the ring, and hit him with a powerful overhand right. Wallisch grew in the second round, in which he did better than Gassiev, though he wasn't able to hit him with anything significant. Gassiev didn't use his jab in the third round, stalking Wallisch with punches, but Wallisch managed to hit him with some shots. Gassiev, who is known for starting slow, hit Wallisch with power shots over head and body in the fourth round. Gassiev floored Wallisch two times in the fourth round, and then attacked him with a stream of punches, and the referee stopped the fight right before the bell.

Professional boxing record

References

External links
 

Living people
1985 births
German male boxers
Heavyweight boxers
Sportspeople from Munich